Articles (arranged alphabetically) related to Cambodia and Cambodian culture include:

0-9
 25th Tokyo International Film Festival
 2003 Phnom Penh riots, anti-Thai riots over Angkor Wat
 2008 Cambodian-Thai border dispute
 2012 Cambodian Senate election
 2013–2014 Cambodian protests
 2015 AFF U-16 Youth Championship
 2016 AFF U-16 Youth Championship
 2017 Cambodian communal elections
 2018 Cambodian Senate election
 2023 Southeast Asian Games

A
 Abul Kasame
 Accreditation Committee of Cambodia, national higher education quality and assessment body
 ACLEDA Bank, privately owned bank based in Phnom Penh
 ADHOC, human rights organisation, founded in 1991
 Administrative divisions of Cambodia
 Aek Phnum District
 Aekakpheap
 Agence Kampuchea Press
 AH1
 AH11
 Air Cambodge
 Air Dream
 Ak Yum
 Aki Ra
 Al Rockoff
 Al-Serkal Mosque
 Am Rong
An Ambition Reduced to Ashes, a 1995 Cambodian short film drama directed by Norodom Sihanouk
 American University of Phnom Penh
 Amleang
 Ampil Pram Daeum commune
 Ampil Tuk village
 Ampor Tevi
 Ancient Khmer Highway
 Andaeuk Haeb commune
 Andoung Meas District, Ratanakiri Province
 Ang Chan I
 Ang Chan II
 Ang Choulean
 Ang Duong
 Ang Em
 Ang Em (prince)
 Ang Mey
 Ang Nan
 Ang Snguon (prince)
 Ang Tong
 Ang Tong Reachea
 Ang Trapaing Thmor
 Angk Kaev Commune, a commune in Treang District, Takéo Province
 Angk Khnor Commune, a commune in Treang District, Takéo Province
 Angk Prasat Commune, a commune in Kiri Vong District, Takéo Province
 Angk Snuol
 Angk Snuol District
 Angk Ta Saom Commune, a commune in Tram Kak District, Takéo Province
 Angkanh Commune, a commune in Treang District, Takéo Province
 Angkor
 Angkor Airways
 Angkor Ban commune
 Angkor Beer
 Angkor Borei, Takeo Province
 Angkor Borei and Phnom Da, Takeo Province
 Angkor Borei Commune, a commune in Angkor Borei District, Takéo Province
 Angkor Borei District, a district in Takéo Province
 Angkor Chey District
 Angkor Chum District
 Angkor EV
 Angkor Extra Stout
 Angkor Hospital for Children
 Angkor International Airport
 Angkor National Youth Orchestra
 Angkor Thom
 Angkor Thom District
 Angkor University
 Angkor Wat
 Angkouch
 Aṅgulimāla
 Anlong Run
 Anlong Veng
 Anlong Veng District, Oddar Meanchey Province
 Anlong Vil
 Annamite Range
 Anthem of the People's Republic of Kampuchea
 António da Madalena
 ANZ Royal Bank, joint venture of ANZ and Royal Group
 Aok Sokunkanha
 Aoral District
 Apostolic Prefecture of Battambang
 Apostolic Prefecture of Kompong Cham
 Apostolic Vicariate of Phnom Penh
 APSARA
 Apsara International Air
 Apsaras
 Architecture of Cambodia
 Norodom Arunrasmy
 Asia Emergency Response Facility
 Asia Euro United
 Asia Euro University
 Asia-Pacific Broadcasting Union
 Association of Southeast Asian Nations
 Asura (Buddhism)
 Auddhatya
 Aun Pornmoniroth
 Australia–Cambodia relations
 Auto rickshaw
 Autogenocide
 Av Pak

B
 Bai pong moan
 Ba Phnum District, Prey Veng Province
 Ba Srae Commune, a commune in Angkor Borei District, Takéo Province
 Bakan District, Pursat Province
 Bakong
 Baksei Chamkrong, temple
 Baksey Cham Krong, rock band in pre-Khmer Rouge
 Bamboo Island, Cambodia
 Ban Kam Commune
 Banan District, Battambang Province
 Banan District
 Bangkok Plot
 Bank for Investment and Development of Cambodia
 Banlung
 Banlung Municipality, Ratanakiri Province
 Bansay Traeng
 Banteay Ampil District, Oddar Meanchey Province
 Banteay Chhmar
 Banteay Kdei
 Banteay Meanchey
 Banteay Meanchey (National Assembly constituency)
 Banteay Meanchey Province
 Banteay Meas District
 Banteay Neang
 Banteay Prey Nokor
 Banteay Samré
 Banteay Srei
 Banteay Srei District
 Banteay Srey Butterfly Centre
 Baphuon
 Bar Kaev District, Ratanakiri Province
 Bar Kham
 Baraminreachea
 Barang (Khmer word)
 Barang Thleak
 Baray
 Sangkat Baray, sangkat in Doun Kaev Municipality, Takéo Province
 Baray District
 Baribour District, Kampong Chhnang
 Barom Reachea II
 Barom Reachea III
 Barom Reachea V
 Barom Reameathibtei
 Basedth District
 Bassac River
 Bassaka Air
 Bat Chum, temple 
 Bat Doeng
 Bat Trang (khum of Cambodia)
 Batheay District, a district of Kampong Cham Province
 Bati District, Takeo Province
 Batom Reachea
 Battambang
 Battambang (National Assembly constituency)
 Battambang Airport
 Battambang Municipality
 Battambang Province
 Battambang Province (Thailand)
 Battambang Provincial Museum
 Battambang River
 Battambang Royal railway station
 Battle of Kampot
 Battle of Kompong Speu
 Battle of Svay Rieng
 Bavel (commune)
 Bavel District
 Bavet Municipality
 Bay Damram, commune
 Bay of Kompong Som
 Bayap Zoo
 Bayon
 Bayon Beer
 Bayon Television
 Beat Richner
 Beehive Radio
 Beehive Social Democratic Party
 Before the Fall (2015 film)
 Ben Kiernan
 Beng Mealea
 Bhante Dharmawara
 Bhavavarman I
 The Big Durian (sculpture)
 Bin Chhin
 Black Panther Premium Stout
 Black Virgin Mountain
 Blood in Dispute
 Boeng Beng
 Boeng Keng Kang, Khan ~, khan in Phnom Penh
 Boeng Per Wildlife Sanctuary 
 Boeng Pring
 Boeng Tonle Chhmar 
 Boeng Tranh Khang Cheung Commune, a commune in Samraŏng District, Takéo Province
 Boeng Tranh Khang Tboung Commune, a commune in Samraŏng District, Takéo Province
 Boeung Kak
 Bok l'hong
 Bokator
 Bokor Hill Station
 Bon Dalien
 Bon Om Touk
 Borei O’Svay Sen Chey District, Stung Treng Province
 Boribo River
 Bos Sbov
 Botum Sakor District
 Botum Sakor National Park
 Bour Kry Supreme Patriarch of the Dhammayuttika Order
 Bourei Cholsar Commune, a commune in Bourei Cholsar District, Takéo Province
 Bourei Cholsar District, a district in Takéo Province
 Bou Sra Waterfall
 Boys' Brigade Learning Centre, Cambodia
 Brigade 70 (B-70)
 Buddhism in Cambodia
 Buddhist Institute
 Buddhist Liberal Democratic Party
 Build Bright University
 Bun Rany
 Bunong people
 BVB (Cambodia)

C
 C-League
 Cà Mau Province
 Cabinet of Cambodia
 Cabinet of Hun Sen
 Calmette Hospital
 Cambodge Soir
 Cambodia
 Cambodia's Got Talent
 Cambodia's Got Talent (season 1)
 Cambodia's Next Top Model
 Cambodia's Next Top Model (season 1)
 Cambodia, Pol Pot, and the United States
Cambodia: A Book For People Who Find Television too Slow, a book of short stories by Brian Fawcett
 Cambodia: Between War and Peace
 Cambodia (song)
 Cambodia Adventist School
 Cambodia Adventist School – Kantrok
 Cambodia Airlines
 Cambodia Airways
 Cambodia and the International Monetary Fund
 Cambodia and the World Bank
 Cambodia Angkor Air
 Cambodia Asia Bank
 Cambodia at the 1956 Summer Olympics
 Cambodia at the 1964 Summer Olympics
 Cambodia at the 1972 Summer Olympics
 Cambodia at the 1996 Summer Olympics
 Cambodia at the 2000 Summer Olympics
 Cambodia at the 2000 Summer Paralympics
 Cambodia at the 2004 Summer Olympics
 Cambodia at the 2004 Summer Paralympics
 Cambodia at the 2005 Southeast Asian Games
 Cambodia at the 2007 Southeast Asian Games
 Cambodia at the 2008 Summer Olympics
 Cambodia at the 2008 Summer Paralympics
 Cambodia at the 2009 Southeast Asian Games
 Cambodia at the 2009 World Championships in Athletics
 Cambodia at the 2010 Asian Games
 Cambodia at the 2010 Asian Para Games
 Cambodia at the 2010 Summer Youth Olympics
 Cambodia at the 2011 Southeast Asian Games
 Cambodia at the 2011 World Aquatics Championships
 Cambodia at the 2011 World Championships in Athletics
 Cambodia at the 2012 Summer Olympics
 Cambodia at the 2012 Summer Paralympics
 Cambodia at the 2013 Southeast Asian Games
 Cambodia at the 2013 World Aquatics Championships
 Cambodia at the 2013 World Championships in Athletics
 Cambodia at the 2014 Asian Beach Games
 Cambodia at the 2014 Asian Games
 Cambodia at the 2014 Summer Youth Olympics
 Cambodia at the 2015 Southeast Asian Games
 Cambodia at the 2015 World Aquatics Championships
 Cambodia at the 2015 World Championships in Athletics
 Cambodia at the 2016 Summer Olympics
 Cambodia at the 2016 Summer Paralympics
 Cambodia at the 2017 Asian Indoor and Martial Arts Games
 Cambodia at the 2017 World Aquatics Championships
 Cambodia at the 2017 World Championships in Athletics
 Cambodia at the 2018 Asian Games
 Cambodia at the 2018 Asian Para Games
 Cambodia at the 2018 Summer Youth Olympics
 Cambodia at the 2019 World Aquatics Championships
 Cambodia at the 2019 World Athletics Championships
 Cambodia at the AFC Asian Cup
 Cambodia at the Asian Games
 Cambodia at the Olympics
 Cambodia at the Paralympics
 Cambodia at the Southeast Asian Games
 Cambodia Baptist Union
 Cambodia Bay Cycling Tour
 Cambodia Bayon Airlines
 Cambodia–Canada relations
 Cambodia–China relations
 Cambodia Commercial Bank
 Cambodia Constituent Assembly
 Cambodia Daily
 Cambodia Davis Cup team
 Cambodia Democratic Movement of National Rescue
 Cambodia–Denmark relations
 Cambodia Development Cooperation Forum
 Cambodia–France relations
 Cambodia–India relations
 Cambodia–Indonesia relations
 Cambodia–Israel relations
 Cambodia–Japan relations
 Cambodia–Malaysia relations
 Cambodia National and Provincial Resources Data Bank
 Cambodia national baseball team
 Cambodia national basketball team
 Cambodia national cricket team
 Cambodia national football team
 Cambodia national football team results
 Cambodia national futsal team
 Cambodia National Rescue Movement
 Cambodia National Rescue Party
 Cambodia national rugby union team
 Cambodia national under-17 football team
 Cambodia national under-21 football team
 Cambodia national under-23 football team
 Cambodia–Pakistan relations
 Cambodia–Philippines relations
 Cambodia–Russia relations
 Cambodia Scouts
 Cambodia Securities Exchange
 Cambodia–Serbia relations
 Cambodia–Singapore relations
 Cambodia–Spain relations
 Cambodia–Thailand relations
 Cambodia Town, Long Beach, California
 Cambodia Tribunal
 Cambodia under Pol Pot (1975-1979)
 Cambodia under Sihanouk (1954-1970)
 Cambodia–United Kingdom relations
 Cambodia–United States relations
 Cambodia University of Specialties
 Cambodia-Vietnam Friendship Monument
 Cambodia–Vietnam relations
 Cambodia women's national football team
 Cambodia women's national volleyball team
 Cambodian, disambiguation page

 Cambodian Americans
 Cambodian Americans in Los Angeles
 Cambodian art
 Cambodian Association of Illinois
 Cambodian Australians
 Cambodian Braille
 Cambodian Campaign
 Cambodian Canadians
 Cambodian Canadians in the Greater Toronto Area
 Cambodian Center for Human Rights
 Cambodian Center for Study and Development in Agriculture
 Cambodian Children's Fund
 Cambodian Civil War
 Cambodian coup of 1970
 Cambodian cuisine
 Cambodian Cultural Village
 Cambodian culture
 Cambodian diplomatic missions
 Cambodian–Dutch War
 Cambodian franc
 Cambodian Football Federation
 Cambodian Freedom Fighters
 Cambodian French (disambiguation)
 Cambodian French (linguistics)
 Cambodian French (people)
 Cambodian genocide
 Cambodian genocide denial
 Cambodian Hokkien
 Cambodian humanitarian crisis
 Cambodian Idol
 Cambodian Idol (season 1)
 Cambodian Idol (season 2)
 Cambodian jungle girl
 Cambodian Landmine Museum
 Cambodian language
 Cambodian laughingthrush
 Cambodian League
 Cambodian League for the Promotion and Defense of Human Rights
 Cambodian Liberty Party
 Cambodian literature
 Cambodian logsucker
 Cambodian Marine Corps
 Cambodian Mekong University
 Cambodian Midget Fighting League
 Cambodian name
 Cambodian National Insurance Company
 Cambodian National Sustaining Party
 Cambodian National Unity Party
 Cambodian Navy SEALs
 Cambodian New Year
 Cambodian Para-Commando Battalion
 2003 Cambodian parliamentary election
 2008 Cambodian parliamentary election
 Cambodian passport
 Cambodian People's Party
 Cambodian Public Bank
 Cambodian rebellion (1811–12)
 Cambodian rebellion (1820)
 Cambodian rebellion (1840)
 Cambodian Red Cross
 Cambodian riel
 Cambodian rock (1960s–1970s)
 Cambodian Rocks
 Cambodian Royal Chronicles
 Cambodian Second League
 Cambodian Self Help Demining
 Cambodian SingMeng Telemedia
 Cambodian Son
 Cambodian–Spanish War
 Cambodian striped squirrel
 Cambodian tailorbird
 Cambodian Television Network
 Cambodian–Thai border dispute
 Cambodian tical
 Cambodian units of measurement
 Cambodian-Vietnamese War
 Cambodian Youth Party
 Cambodians in France
 CamEd Business School
 Camko City
 Camnet Internet Service
 Canadia Bank
 Candlelight Party
 Cardamom Mountains
 Cardamom Mountains rain forests
 Catholic Church in Cambodia
 Central Cardamom Mountains
 Central Market, Phnom Penh
 Central Market BRT station
 Cha Ung
 Cha'ung Dai Ovpuk
 Chaeng Mean Chey
 Chakhe
 Chakraval Daily
 Chakrei
 Cham
 Cham am
 Cham people
 Cham Prasidh
 Cham script
 Chambak Commune (Bati District), a commune in Bati District, Takéo Province
 Chamkar Leu (town), the district capital of Chamkar Leu District
 Chamkar Leu District, a district of Kampong Cham Province
 Chamkar Mon Section
 Chamkar Samraong
 Chamkarmon
 Chamnaom
 Champa
 Champa Commune, a commune in Prey Kabbas District, Takéo Province
 Champei Commune (Bati District), a commune in Bati District, Takéo Province
 Chamrieng Samai
 Chan (commune)
 Chan Nak
 Chan Sarun
 Chan Sy
 Chang kben
 Changha
 Chankiri Tree
 Channel 3 (Cambodia)
 Chanthou Oeur Cambodian painter
 Chantrea District, Svay Rieng Province
 Chaophraya Aphaiphubet (Baen)
 Chap (instrument)
 Chapei dang veng
 Char Commune, a commune in Prey Kabbas District, Takéo Province
 Châu Đốc River
 Chau Say Tevoda
 Chau Seng
 Chau Sen Cocsal Chhum
 Chbar Ampov Section
 Chbar Mon (district)
 Chbar Mon (town)
 Chbar Mon Municipality
 Che Bong Nga
 Chea
 Chea Sim
 Chea Sophara
 Chea Soth
 Chea Vichea
 Cheam Channy
 Cheam Entry Kmao
 Cheam Yeab
 Cheang Tong Commune, a commune in Tram Kak District, Takéo Province
 Chek Deth
 Chem Widhya
 Cheng Heng
 Chenla
 Chenla I
 Chenla II
 Chetr Borei District
 Cheung Kuon Commune, a commune in Samraŏng District, Takéo Province
 Cheung Prey District
 Chey Chettha II
 Chey Chettha III
 Chey Chettha V
 Chey Chouk Commune, a commune in Bourei Cholsar District, Takéo Province
 Chey Saen District, Preah Vihear Province
 Chhaeb District, Preah Vihear Province
 Chhay Tan
 Chhayam, a traditional Khmer musical dance
 Chhean Vam
 Chhep Wildlife Sanctuary
 Chhet Sovan Panha
 Chheu Teal, commune
 Chhim Sothy, Cambodian painter
 Chhloung District
 Chhnal Moan
 Chhoen Rithy, Cambodian artist
 Chhom Nimol
 Chhouk District
 Chhouk Rin
 Chhun Yasith
 Chi Khma Commune, a commune in Treang District, Takéo Province
 Chi Kraeng District
 Chikreng River
 Chinary Ung
 Chinese Cambodian
 Ching
 Ching (instrument)
 Chinit River
 Chi-Phat
 Chnuor Mean Chey
 Choam Ksan
 Choam Khsant District, Preah Vihear Province
 Chob Vari
 Choeng Chum
 Choeung Ek
 Chok Chey
 Chol Kiri District
 Chompa Toung
 Chomrieng Et Preang Tuok
 Chong Kal District, Oddar Meanchey Province
 Chong Khneas Catholic Church
 Chou Bun Eng
 Chong language
 Choun Nath
 Chrey, Moung Ruessei
 Chrey, Thma Koul
 Chrey Seima
 Chrieng Brunh
 Chroy Changva Bridge
 Chrouy Changvar Section
 Chrouy Sdau
 Chula Sakarat
 Chum Kiri District
 Chum Mey, one of the seven survivors of S-21
 Chumreah Pen Commune, a commune in Samraŏng District, Takéo Province
 Chuon Nath
 Chut Wutty
 Chutema, Kep
 Cinema of Cambodia
 Cinnamomum cambodianum
 Cinnamomum parthenoxylon
 City of Ghosts (2002 film)
 City University, Cambodia
 Civilizing mission
 Coalition Government of Democratic Kampuchea
 Cochinchina
 Colonial Cambodia
 Comin Asia
 Commando Blindé du Cambodge
 Committee to Defend His Majesty's Neutrality Policy
 Commune council
 Communes of Cambodia
 Communications in Cambodia
 Communist Party of Kampuchea
 Communist Youth League of Kampuchea
 Community of Royalist People's Party
 Concerts for the People of Kampuchea
 Cooper-Church Amendment
 Cuisine of Cambodia
 Culture of Cambodia

D
 Dăm Thnăm
 Dambae
 Dambaer District, Tboung Khmum Province
 Damkhat Reachea
 Damnak Chang'aeur District
 Dâmrei Mountains
 Dana Stone
 Dance in Cambodia
 Dang Tong District
 Dangkao Section
 Dangkor
 Dângrêk Mountains
 Dâmrei Mountains
 Dap Prampi Mesa Chokchey
 Daun Penh
 Dav Bakdong Meas
 Davy Chou
 Death and state funeral of Norodom Sihanouk
 Deforestation in Cambodia
 Degar refugees in Cambodia
 Democratic Kampuchea
 Democratic Movement of Change
 Democratic Party (Cambodia)
 Demographics of Cambodia
 Department of Media and Communication (RUPP)
 Deportation of Cambodian Americans
 Deputy Presidents of the State Presidium of Kampuchea
 Dhammayietra
 Dhammayuttika Nikaya, order of Theravada Buddhist monks in Cambodia
 Dharanindravarman I
 Dharanindravarman II
 Dien Del
 Digital Divide Data
 Districts and Sections of Cambodia
 Dith Pran
 Dong Peng, a protected area in Koh Kong Province
 Don't Think I've Forgotten
 Doun Ba
 Doun Kaev (town)
 Doun Kaev District, former district of Takeo Province
 Doun Kaev Municipality, in Takéo Province
 Doun Penh Section
 Doung Commune (Bati District), a commune in Bati District, Takéo Province
 Doung Khpos Commune, a commune in Bourei Cholsar District, Takéo Province
 Dum
 Duong Sam Ol
 Duong Saree, Cambodian artist
 Dy Saveth, Cambodian actress

E
 Early history of Cambodia
 East Baray
 East Mebon
 Economic history of Cambodia
 Economy of Cambodia
 Education in Cambodia
 Eh Phoutong
 Ek Yi Oun
 Ek Phnom District
 Elections in Cambodia
 Electricity Authority of Cambodia
 Elizabeth Becker
 Embassy of Cambodia in Moscow
 Emory C. Swank
 Eng Chhai Eang
 Ethnic groups in Cambodia
 Étienne Aymonier
 Expressways of Cambodia
 Extraordinary Chambers in the Courts of Cambodia, a joint court established to try senior members of the Khmer Rouge

F
 Family tree of Cambodian monarchs
 FCU UNTAC
 Fish amok
 First Cambodia Airlines
 First Indochina War
 First They Killed My Father
 First They Killed My Father (film)
 Flag of Cambodia
 Football Federation of Cambodia
 Foreign Correspondents' Club, Phnom Penh
 Foreign relations of Cambodia
 Francis Garnier
 François Bizot
 Free Trade Union of Workers of the Kingdom of Cambodia
 Freedom Park (Cambodia)
 French Indochina
 French Indochinese piastre
 French language in Cambodia
 French protectorate of Cambodia
 Fried spider
 Funan

 Funcinpec

G
 Gambling in Cambodia
 General Secretary of the Communist Party of Kampuchea
 Geography of Cambodia
 George Chigas, Associate Director of the Cambodian Genocide Program at Yale University
 Geraldine Cox
 German Apsara Conservation Project
 Ghosananda, Preah Maha
 Girl Guides Association of Cambodia
 GMS Environment Operations Center
 Gordon Vuong
 Grand Order of National Merit
 Grassroots Democratic Party (Cambodia)
 Greater Mekong Subregion
 Green papaya salad
 GRUNK
 Gulf of Thailand

H
 Hà Tiên Province
 Principality of Hà Tiên
 Haing S. Ngor
 Hak Chhay Hok
 Hang Chuon Naron
 Hang Dara Democratic Movement Party
 Hang Meas HDTV
 Hang Thun Hak
 Hariharalaya
 Harshavarman I
 Harshavarman II
 Harshavarman III
 Hat Pak, commune
 Health in Cambodia
 Hello United
 Hem Chieu
 Hem Heng
 Hen Sophal, Cambodian artist
 Heng Pov
 Heng Samrin
 Henri Mouhot
 Him Sivorn
 Hindu temple architecture
 History of Cambodia
 Ho Chi Minh City
 Hok Lundy
 Home of English International
 Honda, Keisuke
 Hope Stevens
 Hor Nambora, Ambassador to the United Kingdom since 2004
 Hor Namhong, Minister of Foreign Affairs and International Cooperation since 1998
 Hotel Cambodiana
 Hou Yuon
 Hu Nim
 Human rights in Cambodia
 Human Rights Party (Cambodia)
 Hun Manith
 Hun Many
 Hun Neang
 Hun Phoeung
 Hun Sen
 Huot Tat
 Huoy Meas

I
 ISO 3166-2:KH
 Ieng Mouly
 Ieng Sary
 Ieng Thirith
 Ieu Koeus
 Ieu Pannakar, Cambodian film director and senator
 IIC University of Technology
 Im Sothy
 Im Suosdey
 In Tam
 In Vichet
 Independence Day of Cambodia
 Independence Monument, Phnom Penh
 Indochina
 Indochina Media Memorial Foundation
 Indochina refugee crisis
 Indochina Wars
 Indradevi
 Indrapura (Khmer)
 Indrajayavarman
 Indravarman I
 Indravarman II
 Indravarman III
 Ing Kuntha Phavi
 Institute of Foreign Languages
 Institute of Technology of Cambodia
 InterContinental Phnom Penh
 International Finance Complex
 International Institute of Cambodia
 International School of Phnom Penh
 International University, Cambodia
 Isanapura
 Ishanavarman II
 Islam in Cambodia
 ISO 3166-2:KH

J
 Jamrieng samai
 Japanese occupation of Cambodia
 Jarai people
 Jayarajadevi
 Jayavarman I
 Jayavarman II
 Jayavarman III
 Jayavarman IV
 Jayavarman V
 Jayavarman VI
 Jayavarman VII
 Jayavarman VIII
 JC International Airlines
 JC Royal
 Joannès Rivière
 John Dawson Dewhirst
 Johnnie Walker Cambodian Open
 Jombok Hoas
 Jon Swain

K
 .kh
 K5 Plan
 Ka Choun
 Ka Choung
 Kabalromih
 Kaev Hua I
 Kaev Hua II
 Kaev Seima District
 Kah Bpow River
 Kak Commune, Bar Kaev District
 Kakaoh
 Kalai, Cambodia
 Kambojas and Kambodia
 Kamboul, Khan ~, khan in Phnom Penh
 Kamchay Mear District, Prey Veng Province
 Kamnab Commune, a commune in Kiri Vong District, Takéo Province
 Kampeaeng Commune (Kiri Vong District), a commune in Kiri Vong District, Takéo Province
 Kampeaeng Commune (Prey Kabbas District), a commune in Prey Kabbas District, Takéo Province
 Kampong Cham (city)
 Kampong Cham (National Assembly constituency)
 Kampong Cham Airport
 Kampong Cham Municipality
 Kampong Cham Province
 Kampong Chhnang (city)
 Kampong Chhnang (National Assembly constituency)
 Kampong Chhnang (town)
 Kampong Chhnang Airport
 Kampong Chhnang District
 Kampong Chhnang Municipality
 Kampong Chhnang Province
 Kampong Krasang Commune, a commune in Bourei Cholsar District, Takéo Province
 Kampong Leaeng District
 Kampong Leav District, Prey Veng Province
 Kampong Lpou, commune
 Kampong Luong
 Kampong Phluk
 Kampong Preah, commune
 Kampong Prieng, commune
 Kampong Reab Commune (Prey Kabbas District), a commune in Prey Kabbas District, Takéo Province
 Kampong Rou
 Kampong Rou District, Svay Rieng Province
 Kampong Seila (commune)
 Kampong Seila District, Sihanoukville Province
 Kampong Siam
 Kampong Siem District
 Kampong Speu (National Assembly constituency)
 Kampong Speu (town), the capital of Kampong Speu Province
 Kampong Speu Province
 Kampong Svay, Banteay Meanchey
 Kampong Svay District
 Kampong Thom
 Kampong Thom (National Assembly constituency)
 Kampong Thom city
 Kampong Thom Province
 Kampong Trabaek District, Prey Veng Province
 Kampong Trach District
 Kampong Tralach District
 Kampot (city), the provincial capital
 Kampot (National Assembly constituency)
 Kampot Airport
 Kampot Cement
 Kampot Municipality
 Kampot pepper
 Kampot Province, Cambodia
 Kampot sea salt
 Kampot Zoo
 Kampuchea Airlines
 Kampuchea Christian Council
 Kampuchea Krom
 Kampuchea Thmei Daily
 Kampuchea Thnai Nes
 Kampuchean People's Representative Assembly
 Kampuchean People's Revolutionary Armed Forces
 Kampuchean Revolutionary Army
 Kampuchean United Front for National Salvation
 Kamrieng (commune)
 Kamrieng District
 Kandal (National Assembly constituency)
 Kandal Province
 Kandal Stueng
 Kandal Stueng District
 Kandieng District, Pursat Province
 Kandoeng Commune, a commune in Bati District, Takéo Province
 Kang Kek Iew
 Kang Meas City
 Kang Meas District
 Kangtoap Padevat
 Kanhchriech District, Prey Veng Province
 Phat Kanhol
 Huy Kanthoul
 Norodom Kantol
 Kantueu Muoy
 Kantueu Pir
 Kanychok Sangkhum
 Kaoh Andaet District, a district in Takéo Province
 Kaoh Chbar, Kratie Province
 Kaoh Nheaek District
 Kaoh Pang, commune
 Kaoh Peak, commune
 Kaoh Pong Satv
 Kaoh Thkov
 Kaoh Thum District
 Kbach
 Kbach kun boran
 Kbach kun dambong veng
 Kbal Chhay Waterfall
 Kbal Spean
 Kdanh Commune, a commune in Prey Kabbas District, Takéo Province
 Kdol Doun Teav
 Kdol Tahen
 Ke Pauk
 Kear (khum)
 Keh Chong, commune
 Kem Sokha
 Keo Meas
 Keo Puth Rasmey
 Keo Seima Wildlife Sanctuary
 Keo Sokpheng
 Kep, Cambodia
 Kep (National Assembly constituency)
 Kep (town)
 Kep Chuktema
 Kep Municipality
 Kep National Park
 Kep Province
 Khan Boeng Keng Kang, khan in Phnom Penh
 Khan Kamboul, khan in Phnom Penh
 Khang Khek Ieu
 Khao-I-Dang, refugee camp on the Cambodian border
 Khemara (disambiguation)
 Khemara (NGO)
 Khemara Keila FC
 Khemarak Phoumin
 Khemarak Phoumin Municipality
 Sar Kheng
 Khet (country subdivision)
 Khieu Chum
 Khieu Ponnary
 Khieu Rada
 Khieu Samphan
 Khim
 Khim Tit
 Khin Sok
 Khleangs
 Khloy
 Khmer (disambiguation)
 Khmer (album)
 Khmer (food)
 Khmer (Unicode block)
 Khmer Air Force
 Khmer Anti-Poverty Party
 Khmer architecture
 Khmer art
 Khmer Bird
 Khmer ceramics
 Khmer Ceramics & Fine Arts Centre
 Khmer–Chinese Friendship Association
 Khmer classical dance
 Khmer clothing
 Khmer cuisine
 Khmer culture
 Khmer dance
 Khmer dancer
 Khmer Democratic Party
 Khmer dialects
 Khmer Empire
 Khmer folklore
 Khmer food
 Khmer Front Party
 Khmer grammar
 Khmer instruments
 Khmer Issarak
 Khmer Khe dialect
 Khmer Krom
 Khmer Loeu
 Khmer language
 Khmer literature
 Khmer Mekong Films
 Khmer monarch
 Khmer musical instrumentsKhmer Loves Khmer Party
 Khmer name
 Khmer National Armed Forces
 Khmer National Army
 Khmer National Liberation Committee
 Khmer National Navy
 Khmer National Party of Cambodia
 Khmer National Solidarity Party
 Khmer National United Party
 Khmer National Unity Front
 Khmer nationalism
 Khmer Neutral Party
 Khmer New Year
 Khmer numerals
 Khmer people
 Khmer People's National Liberation Armed Forces
 Khmer People's National Liberation Front
 Khmer Power Party
 Khmer Renovation
 Khmer Republic
 Khmer Republic at the 1972 Summer Olympics
 Khmer Republican Party
 Khmer Rouge
 Khmer Rouge rule of Cambodia
 Khmer Rouge Tribunal
 Khmer Rumdo
 Khmer sastra
 Khmer script
 Khmer sculpture
 Khmer Serei
 Khmer shadow theatre
 Khmer–Soviet Friendship Hospital
 Khmer Special Forces
 Khmer Surin
 Khmer Symbols
 Khmer Times
 Khmer traditional wrestling
 Khmer Will Party
 Khmer Writers' Association
 Khmers Kampuchea-Krom Federation
 Khmuoh
 Phnom Kmoch
 Khnach Romeas
 Thong Khon
 Khone Phapheng Falls
 Peter Khoy Saukam
 Khoy Thoun
 Khsach Kandal
 Khsach Kandal District
 Khum
 Khŭm Sráng
 Khun Srun
 Khuon Sodary
 Khvav Commune (Samraong District), a commune in Samraŏng District, Takéo Province
 Khvav Commune (Treang District), a commune in Treang District, Takéo Province
 Kien Svay
 Kien Svay District
 Killing caves of Phnom Sampeau
 Killing Fields
 Rim Kin
 King of Cambodia
 Kingdom of Cambodia (1953–1970)
 Kiri Chong Kaoh Commune, a commune in Kiri Vong District, Takéo Province
 Kiri Sakor District
 Kiri Vong District, a district in Takéo Province
 Kirirom National Park
 Kith Meng
 Kizuna Bridge
 Klang Beer
 Koas Krala (commune)
 Koas Krala District
 Koh Ach Seh
 Koh Dek Koul
 Koh Ker
 Koh Kong (city)
 Koh Kong (island)
 Koh Kong (National Assembly constituency)
 Koh Kong Airport
 Koh Kong Bridge
 Koh Kong District
 Koh Kong Province
 Koh Kong Safari World
 Koh Pich
 Koh Poulo Wai
 Koh Preab
 Koh Pring
 Koh Puos
 Koh Rong
 Koh Rong (town)
 Koh Rong Sanloem
 Koh Russei
 Koh Sdach
 Koh Seh
 Koh Sotin
 Koh Sotin District
 Koh Ta Kiev
 Koh Tang
 Koh Thmei
 Koh Tonsay
 Koh Thum
 Koh Santepheap Daily
 Kok Lak, commune
 Komar Reachea Commune, a commune in Bati District, Takéo Province
 Kompull Boros Mok 2
 Kong chmol
 Kong Kam Kong Keo
 Kong Korm
 Kong nyee
 Kong Pisei (district)
 Kong Pisei District
 Kong River
 Kong Som Eun
 Kong thom
 Kong toch
 Kong Vibol
 Kong von thom
 Kossamak Nearirat Serey Vathana
 Koub
 Kouk Ballangk
 Kouk Kakthen
 Kouk Khmum, commune
 Kouk Pou Commune, a commune in Bourei Cholsar District, Takéo Province
 Kouk Prech Commune, a commune in Kiri Vong District, Takéo Province
 Kouk Samraong
 Kouk Thlok Commune, a commune in Angkor Borei District, Takéo Province
 Koulen Mountain
 Koun Mom District, Ratanakiri Province
 Kouprey
 Koy Maeng
 Krakor Airport
 Krakor District, Pursat Province
 Kralanh District
 Krama
 Krang Leav Commune (Bati District), a commune in Bati District, Takéo Province
 Krang Ponley River
 Krang Thnong Commune, a commune in Bati District, Takéo Province
 Krapum Chhuk Commune, a commune in Kaoh Andaet District, Takéo Province
 Krasue
 Kratié (National Assembly constituency)
 Kratié (town)
 Kratié Airport
 Kratié Municipality
 Kratié Province
 Kreung
 Kris Dim
 Kroeung
 Krol Ko
 Krom
 Phnom Krom
 Prasat Phnom Krom
 Krom Ngoy
 Krouch Chhmar
 Krouch Chhmar District, Tboung Khmum Province
 Bour Kry
 Kse diev
 Kting Voar
 Kula people (Asia)
 Kuleaen District, Preah Vihear Province
 Kulen Elephant Forest
 Phnom Kulen National Park
 Kulen Promtep Wildlife Sanctuary
 Kumru, Cambodia
 Kus Commune, a commune in Tram Kak District, Takéo Province
 Kutisvara
 Kuttasat
 Chavay Kuy
 Kuy language
 Kuy people
 Kuy teav

L
 L'ak, commune
 L´Écho du Cambodge, newspaper
 L'OKNHA Suttantaprija ind
 La Minh, commune
 Laang Spean
 Lake Yeak Laom
 Lakhon Khol
 Land alienation in Ratanakiri Province
 Landmines in Cambodia
 Lanmei Airlines
 Lau (instrument)
 Lavo Kingdom
 Law enforcement in Cambodia
 Lbak Khaon
Le papier ne peut pas envelopper la braise, French-Cambodian documentary film directed by Rithy Panh
 League for Democracy Party
 Leay Bour Commune, a commune in Tram Kak District, Takéo Province
 Leng Ngeth
 Les Kosem
 Leuk Daek
 Leuk Daek District
 LGBT rights in Cambodia
 Liberal Democratic Party (Cambodia)
 Liberal Party (Cambodia)
 Liev Tuk
 Line 01 (Phnom Penh Bus Rapid Transit)
 Line 02 (Phnom Penh Bus Rapid Transit)
 Line 03 (Phnom Penh Bus Rapid Transit)
 Line 4A (Phnom Penh Bus Rapid Transit)
 Line of succession to the Cambodian Throne
 List of administrators of the French protectorate of Cambodia
 List of airlines of Cambodia
 List of airports by ICAO code: V
 List of airports in Cambodia
 List of birds of Cambodia
 List of banks in Cambodia
 List of Cambodian Americans
 List of Cambodian artists
 List of Cambodian companies
 List of Cambodian districts and sections
 List of Cambodian films
 List of Cambodian inland islands
 List of Cambodian provinces by Human Development Index
 List of Cambodian singers
 List of Cambodian submissions for the Academy Award for Best International Feature Film
 List of Cambodians
 List of cathedrals in Cambodia
 List of cities and towns in Cambodia
 List of cities in Cambodia
 List of companies of Cambodia
 List of current members of the National Assembly of Cambodia
 List of deputy prime ministers of Cambodia
 List of ecoregions in Cambodia
 List of ethnic groups in Cambodia
 List of flag bearers for Cambodia at the Olympics
 List of football clubs in Cambodia
 List of Governors-General of French Indochina
 List of governors of Phnom Penh
 List of islands of Cambodia
 List of heads of state of Cambodia
 List of Khmer entertainment companies
 List of Khmer film actors
 List of Khmer film directors
 List of Khmer soap operas
 List of lakes of Cambodia
 List of lighthouses in Cambodia
 List of mammals in Cambodia
 List of members of the Constituent Assembly of Cambodia, 1993–98
 List of members of the National Assembly of Cambodia, 1998–2003
 List of members of the National Assembly of Cambodia, 2003–08
 List of members of the National Assembly of Cambodia, 2008–13
 List of members of the National Assembly of Cambodia, 2013–18
 List of mosques in Cambodia
 List of museums in Cambodia
 List of newspapers in Cambodia
 List of non-marine molluscs of Cambodia
 List of newspapers in Cambodia
 List of political parties in Cambodia
 List of power stations in Cambodia
 List of presidents of the National Assembly of Cambodia
 List of presidents of the Senate of Cambodia
 List of prime ministers of Cambodia
 List of protected areas of Cambodia
 List of railway stations in Cambodia
 List of rivers of Cambodia
 List of schools in Cambodia
 List of tallest buildings in Cambodia
 List of trees of Cambodia
 List of universities in Cambodia
 List of volcanoes in Cambodia
 List of weapons of the Cambodian Civil War
 List of World Heritage Sites in Cambodia
 List of years in Cambodia
 Little Cambodia
 Little Phnom Penh, Long Beach, California
 Lkhon pol srey
 Lolei
 Lomphat Wildlife Sanctuary
 Lon Nil
 Lon Nol
 Lon Non
 Long Boret
 Longvek
 Loto, Cambodian dwarf actor and comedian
 Loung Ung
 Lucky Child
 Lum Choar
 Lumchang Commune, a commune in Samraŏng District, Takéo Province
 Lumphat District, Ratanakiri Province
 Lumpong Commune, a commune in Bati District, Takéo Province
 Lung Khung, commune
 Luu Meng
 Lvea, commune
 Lvea Aem
 Lvea Aem District
 Lycée français René Descartes de Phnom Penh
 Lycée Sisowath

M
 Mạc Cửu
 Mạc Thiên Tứ
 Macchanu
 Maha Nikaya, an order of Theravada Buddhist monks in Cambodia
 Mahanipata Jataka
 Mahendraparvata
 Mahendravarman
 Mahendravarman (Chenla)
 Majority Leader (Cambodia)
 Mak Sensonita
 Makuṭa
 Malai (commune)
 Phnom Malai
 Malai District
 Malis (restaurant)
 Malcolm Caldwell
 Malik, Cambodia, commune
 Mam Bunheng
 Mam Nai
 Mam Sonando
 Mangalartha, East Prasat Top, Monument 487
 Hun Manith
 Mao Sareth
 Norodom Marie
 Mayagüez incident
 Me Sang District, Prey Veng Province
 Mean Chey Commune (Samlout), Battambang Province
 Mean Chey Section
 Mean Sonyta
 Meanchey
 Meas
 Huoy Meas
 Meas Samon
 Media of Cambodia
 Medical University BRT station
 Mekong
 Mekong Airlines
 Mekong Delta
 Mekong expedition of 1866–1868
 Mekong Institute
 Mekong River Commission
 Memot
 Memot District, Tboung Khmum Province
 Men Sam An
 Meng Keo Pichenda
 Military Police (Cambodian football club)
 Milton Osborne
 Ministry of Agriculture, Forestry and Fisheries (Cambodia)
 Ministry of Commerce (Cambodia)
 Ministry of Culture and Fine Arts (Cambodia)
 Ministry of Economy and Finance (Cambodia)
 Ministry of Education, Youth and Sport (Cambodia)
 Ministry of Environment (Cambodia)
 Ministry of Foreign Affairs and International Cooperation (Cambodia)
 Ministry of Health (Cambodia)
 Ministry of Industry and Handicrafts (Cambodia)
 Ministry of Information (Cambodia)
 Ministry of Interior (Cambodia)
 Ministry of Justice (Cambodia)
 Ministry of Labour and Vocational Training (Cambodia)
 Ministry of Land Management, Urban Planning and Construction (Cambodia)
 Ministry of Mines and Energy (Cambodia)
 Ministry of National Defense (Cambodia)
 Ministry of Planning (Cambodia)
 Ministry of Posts and Telecommunications (Cambodia)
 Ministry of Public Works and Transport (Cambodia)
 Ministry of Rural Development (Cambodia)
 Ministry of Tourism (Cambodia)
 Ministry of Women's Affairs (Cambodia)
 Minority Leader (Cambodia)
 Mkak, commune
 Moat Preah, village
 Modern Cambodia
 Mok Mareth
 Vann Molyvann
 Mon people
 Mom Soth, Cambodian film actor
 Monarchy of Cambodia
 Monatio
 Mondol Seima District
 Mondulkiri
 Mondulkiri (National Assembly constituency)
 Mondulkiri Airport
 Mondulkiri Protected Forest
 Mondulkiri Province
 Moneaksekar Khmer
 Mongkol Borei River
 Mongkol Borey (town)
 Mongkol Borey District
 Norodom Monineath
 Sisowath Monipong
 Sisowath Monivong
 Monivong Boulevard
 Monivong Bridge
 Morodok Techo National Sports Complex
 Moulinaka
 Moung, commune
 Moung Ruessei
 Moung Ruessei District
 Mrenh kongveal
 Mroum, commune
 Mu Sochua
 Muang Tum
 Mueang Sing
 Mukh Kampul District
 Dith Munty
 Music of Cambodia
 My Village at Sunset, film by Norodom Sihanouk

N
 Nam Tau, Cambodia, commune
 Names of Cambodia
 Names of Ho Chi Minh City
 Narai Cheng Weng
 Narath Tan, Cambodian sculptor
 Nataing
 National Assembly of Cambodia
 National Bank of Cambodia
 National Centre for HIV/AIDS Dermatology and STDs, Cambodia
 National Day of Remembrance (Cambodia)
 National Election Committee of Cambodia
 National Highway 1 (Cambodia)
 National Highway 2 (Cambodia)
 National Highway 3 (Cambodia)
 National Highway 4 (Cambodia)
 National Highway 5 (Cambodia)
 National Highway 6 (Cambodia)
 National Highway 7 (Cambodia)
 National Highway 8 (Cambodia)
 National Information Communications Technology Development Authority, Cambodia
 National Institute of Education
 National Institute of Statistics
 National Library of Cambodia
 National Malaria Center of Cambodia
 National Museum, Phnom Penh
 National Olympic Committee of Cambodia
 National Olympic Stadium
 National Pediatric Hospital, Cambodia
 National Road 21 (Cambodia)
 National Road 51 (Cambodia)
 National Road 53 (Cambodia)
 National Road 124 (Cambodia)
 National Road 142 (Cambodia)
 National symbols of Cambodia
 National Television of Kampuchea
 National United Front of Kampuchea
 National University of Management
 Natural resources of Cambodia
 Neak Loeung
 Neak Loeung Bridge
 Neak Poan
 Neang Champameas
 Nen Sothearoth
 Neth Savoeun
 New Khmer Architecture
 New people (Kampuchea)
 Nhaeng Nhang Commune, a commune in Tram Kak District, Takéo Province
 Nhiek Tioulong
 Ngoy Srin
 Nguon Nhel
 Nieng Arp, or Lady Vampire, a 2004 Cambodian horror film
 Night Market BRT station
 Nime chow
 Nimit, commune
 Nippean Bat
 Nite Yun
 Nokor Reach
 Nokoreach
 Nong Chan Refugee Camp
 Nong Samet Refugee Camp
 Norea, Cambodia
 Soma Norodom
 Norodom Boulevard
 Norodom Buppha Devi
 Norodom Chakraping Proloung Khmer Party
 Norodom Chakrapong
 Norodom Kanviman Norleak Tevi
 Norodom Marie
 Norodom Monineath
 Norodom Monineath Sihanouk
 Norodom Naradipo
 Norodom Narindrapong
 Norodom of Cambodia
 Norodom Phurissara
 Norodom Ranariddh
 Norodom Sihamoni
 Norodom Sihanouk
 Norodom Sihanouk Memorial
 Norodom Sirivudh
 Norodom Suramarit
 Norodom Vichara
 Norodom Yukanthor
 Norodom Yuvaneath
 Norry
 Northern Khmer dialect
 Norton University
 Notre Dame Cathedral (Phnom Penh)
 Num banhchok
 Nuon Chea
 Nur ul-Ihsan Mosque

O
 O Smach
 Óc Eo
 Ocean of milk
 Oddar Meancheay
 Oddar Meanchey Province
 Odongk (district)
 Oknha
 Ol Ravy
 One Evening After the War, 1998 drama film by Rithy Panh
 Open Forum of Cambodia
 Operation Blue Angel
 Operation Chenla I
 Operation Chenla II
 Operation Eagle Pull
 Operation Freedom Deal
 Operation Menu
 Operation Patio
 Orn Euy Srey Orn
 Otdam Soriya Commune, a commune in Tram Kak District, Takéo Province
 Ou Ambel, commune
 Ou Beichoan, commune
 Ou Char, commune
 Ou Chum (commune)
 Ou Chrov District
 Ou Chum District, Ratanakiri Province
 Ou Da, commune
 Ou Dambang Muoy, commune
 Ou Dambang Pir, commune
 Ou Mal, commune
 Ou Prasat, commune
 Ou Reang District
 Ou Reang Ov
 Ou Reang Ov District, Tboung Khmum Province
 Ou Rumduol, commune
 Ou Sampoar, commune
 Ou Samrel, commune
 Ou Sralau, commune
 Ou Ta Ki, commune
 Ou Virak
 Ou Ya Dav District, Ratanakiri Province
 Oudong
 Oudong District
 Oum Chheang Sun
 Oum Moung
 Our Saray Commune, a commune in Tram Kak District, Takéo Province
 Our Lady of the Assumption Cathedral, Battambang
 Outey I
 Outey II
 Outline of Cambodia
 OVCs, Orphans and Vulnerable Children

P
 Pa Hal, village
 Pa Kalan, commune
 Pa Socheatvong
 Pailin
 Pailin District
 Pailin Province
 Pak Nhai, commune
 Pan Sorasak
 Paññāsāstra University of Cambodia
 Paragon International University, former Zaman University
 Paris Peace Agreements
 Parliament of Cambodia
 Parliament of the Khmer Republic
 Parrot's Beak, Cambodia
 Party of Democratic Kampuchea
 Pate, Cambodia, commune
 Pathya Vat
 Patricia Hy-Boulais
 Patriotic and Democratic Front of the Great National Union of Kampuchea
 Pchum Ben
 Pea Ream Commune, a commune in Bati District, Takéo Province
 Pea Reang District, Prey Veng Province
 Peace Palace, Phnom Penh
 Peacock dance
 Peam Aek, commune
 Peam Bang
 Peam Chor District
 Peam Kaoh Sna, commune
 Peam Krasop Wildlife Sanctuary
 Peam Ro District, Prey Veng Province
 Pear people
 Pearic languages
 Pech Chenda, commune
 Pech Sar Commune, a commune in Kaoh Andaet District, Takéo Province
 Pechr Chenda District
 Peil Dael Truv Yum
 Pen Ran
 Peng Phan, Cambodian film actress
 Pen Ron, singer and songwriter in the 1960s and early 1970s
 Pen Sovan
 Penh
 Penn Nouth
 People's Republic of Kampuchea
 People's Revolutionary Youth Union of Kampuchea
 Pey au
 Pey pok
 Phanom Rung
 Phanomsok
 Phare Ponleu Selpak
 Pheas River
 Phibunsongkhram Province
 Phimai
 Phimeanakas
 Phiset Phanit
 Phkoam, commune
 Phlov Meas, commune
 Phniet, commune
 Phnom Aoral 
 Phnom Aural 
 Phnom Aural Wildlife Sanctuary
 Phnom Bakheng
 Phnom Bok
 Phnom Chhnork
 Phnom Chisor
 Phnom Da, Takeo Province
 Phnom Dei
 Phnom Dei Commune
 Phnom Kmoch
 Phnom Kong Rei
 Phnom Kulen
 Phnom Krom
 Phnom Krom, Prasat ~
 Phnom Krom railway
 Phnom Penh Legend
 Phnom Malai
 Phnom Nam Lyr Wildlife Sanctuary
 Phnom Penh
 Phnom Penh (National Assembly constituency)
 Phnom Penh City Bus
 Phnom Penh Commercial Bank, Cambodia's 23rd bank
 Phnom Penh Crown FC
 Phnom Penh Hotel
 Phnom Penh International Airport
 Phnom Penh International Airport BRT station
 Phnom Penh Institute of Technology
 Phnom Penh Legend
 Phnom Pehn National Olympic Stadium
 Phnom Penh Olympic Stadium
 Phnom Penh Post
 Phnom Prich Wildlife Sanctuary
 Phnom Samkos
 Phnom Samkos Wildlife Sanctuary
 Phnom Santuk
 Phnom Sorsia
 Phnom Srok (town)
 Phnom Srok District
 Phnom Sruoch District
 Phnom Tamao Wildlife Rescue Centre
 Phnom Tbeng Meanchey
 Phnom Tumpor
 Phnom Voar
 Phnum Den Commune, a commune in Kiri Vong District, Takéo Province
 Phnum Kok, commune
 Phnum Kravanh District, Pursat Province
 Phnum Lieb, commune
 Phnum Proek (commune)
 Phnum Proek District
 Phnum Sampov
 Phnum Sruoch (district)
 Pho Proeung
 Phoeurng Sackona
 Phsar Thom Thmei
 Phu Pek
 Phum
 Phum Snay
 Phum Thmei, commune
 Phumbey
 Piastre
 Pidan (textile)
 Pinpeat
 Pisith Pilika
 Pleah sach ko
 Ploy (musical instrument)
 PMTair
 PMTair Flight U4 241
 Poipet
 Poipet Municipality
 Pol Hom
 Pol Pot
 Politics of Cambodia
 Ponhea Kraek
 Ponhea Kraek District, Tboung Khmum Province
 Ponhea Leu
 Ponhea Lueu District
 Ponhea Yat
 Ponley
 Ponley Commune (Angkor Borei District), a commune in Angkor Borei District, Takéo Province
 Popel Commune (Tram Kak District), a commune in Tram Kak District, Takéo Province
 Popokvil Waterfalls
 Post-Angkor Period
 Postage stamps and postal history of Cambodia
 Pot Sar Commune, a commune in Bati District, Takéo Province
 Pou Rumchak Commune, a commune in Prey Kabbas District, Takéo Province
 Pou Senchey Section
 Pov Chouk Sar
 Poverty and NGO in Cambodia
 Poverty in Cambodia
 Poy Char
 Pracheachon
 Pradal Serey
 Prahok
 Prak Mony Udom
 Prak Sokhonn
 Prambei Mum Commune, a commune in Treang District, Takéo Province
 Prampir Makara
 Prampir Makara Section
 Prang (architecture)
 Prasat
 Prasat, Preah Netr Preah, commune
 Prasat Ak Yum
 Prasat Bakong District
 Prasat Balangk District
 Prasat Bayang
 Prasat Kravan
 Prasat Kuh Nokor
 Prasat Phnom Krom
 Prasat Preah Vihear
 Prasat Sambour District
 Prasat Suor Prat
 Prasat Ta Krabey
 Prasat Ta Muen Thom
 Pre Rup
 Preaek Khpob, commune
 Preaek Luong, commune
 Preaek Norint, commune
 Preaek Prasab District
 Preaek Preah Sdach, commune
 Preah Bat Choan Chum Commune, a commune in Kiri Vong District, Takéo Province
 Preah Botumthera Som
 Preah Khan
 Preah Khan Kompong Svay
 Preah Ko
 Preah Ko Preah Keo
 Preah Maha Ghosananda
 Preah Monivong National Park
 Preah Netr Preah, commune
 Preah Netr Preah (town)
 Preah Netr Preah District
 Preah Palilay
 Preah Peay Phat
 Preah Phos, commune
 Preah Pithu
 Preah Ponlea
 Preah Sdach District, Prey Veng Province
 Preah Sihanouk Municipality
 Preah Thaong Neang Neak
 Preah Vihear (town)
 Preah Vihear Municipality
 Preah Vihear Province
 Preah Vihear Temple
 Preap Sovath
 Prek Chik, commune
 Prek Kdam Bridge
 Prek Phtoul Commune, a commune in Angkor Borei District, Takéo Province
 Prek Pnov Bridge
 Prek Pnov Section
 Prek Sbauv
 Prek Tameak Bridge
 Prek Toal
 President Airlines
 Preta
 Prey Ampok Commune, a commune in Kiri Vong District, Takéo Province
 Prey Chas, commune
 Prey Chhor
 Prey Chhor District
 Prey Kabbas Commune, a commune in Prey Kabbas District, Takéo Province
 Prey Kabbas District, a district in Takéo Province
 Prey Khla Commune (Kaoh Andaet District), a commune in Kaoh Andaet District, Takéo Province
 Prey Khpos, commune
 Prey Lang
 Prey Lvea Commune, a commune in Prey Kabbas District, Takéo Province
 Prey Nob District, Sihanoukville Province
 Prey Phdau Commune, a commune in Prey Kabbas District, Takéo Province
 Prey Phkoam Commune, a commune in Angkor Borei District, Takéo Province
 Prey Pros
 Prey Rumdeng Commune (Kiri Vong District), a commune in Kiri Vong District, Takéo Province
 Prey Sloek Commune, a commune in Treang District, Takéo Province
 Prey Svay, commune
 Prey Touch, commune
 Prey Tralach, commune
 Prey Veng
 Prey Veng (city)
 Prey Veng (constituency)
 Prey Veng District
 Prey Veng Municipality
 Prey Veng Province
 Prey Yuthka Commune, a commune in Kaoh Andaet District, Takéo Province
 Prime Minister of Cambodia
 Provinces of Cambodia
 Psah Chas
 PTTC (Siem Reap, Cambodia)
 Public Bank
 Public holidays in Cambodia
 Puok District
 Pursat
 Pursat Municipality
 Pursat Province

Q
 Que la barque se brise, que la jonque s'entrouvre, film by Rithy Panh
 Queen Soma

R
 Rail transport in Cambodia
 Rajendravarman
 Rajendravarman II
 Ramathipadi I
 Ramayana
 Ramkbach
 Ramvong
 Ran Serey Leakhena
 Rasmei Kampuchea Daily
 Ratanakiri
 Ratanakiri Airport
 Ratanakiri Province
 Reach Sambath
 Ream Andaeuk Commune, a commune in Kiri Vong District, Takéo Province
 Ream Chbong Yeung
 Ream National Park
 Ream Naval Base
 Reamker
 Reang Kesei, commune
 Rice People, film
 Rice pounder
 Riel
 Rithy
 Rithy Panh
 Road signs in Cambodia
 Robam Meh Am Bao, a Khmer dance in the form of a play
 Robam Moni Mekala, traditional Khmer dance in the form of a play
 Robam Neary Chea Chuor, Khmer dance of young Cambodian women
 Robas Mongkol, commune
 Rochom P'ngieng
 Rohal, commune
 Rohat Tuek
 Roka, commune
 (Sangkat) Roka Knong, sangkat in Doun Kaev Municipality, Takéo Province
 (Sangkat) Roka Krau, sangkat in Doun Kaev Municipality, Takéo Province
 Roland Eng, Cambodian Ambassador to the United States
 Rolea B'ier District
 Roluos
 Roluos (temples)
 Rom kbach
 Roman Catholicism in Cambodia
 Romanization of Khmer
 Romdoul
 Rôméas
 Romeas Haek
 Romeas Haek District, Svay Rieng Province
 Romenh Commune, a commune in Kaoh Andaet District, Takéo Province
 Romvong
 Roneam Commune, a commune in Treang District, Takéo Province
 Roneat
 Roneat dek
 Roneat ek
 Roneat thung
 Ros Saboeut
 Ros Serey Sothea
 Rotanak, commune
 Rotanak Mondol District
 Rotanak Ros
 Rovieng Commune
 Rovieng District
 Royal Academy of Cambodia
 Royal Air Cambodge
 Royal arms of Cambodia
 Royal ballet of Cambodia
 Royal Cambodian Armed Forces
 Royal Cambodian Air Force
 Royal Cambodian Army
 Royal Cambodian Navy
 Royal Council of the Throne
 Royal Khmer Airlines
 Royal Order of Monisaraphon
 Royal Order of Sahametrei
 Royal Palace of Cambodia
 Royal Phnom Penh Airways
 Royal Ploughing Ceremony
 Royal railway station (Phnom Penh)
 Royal University of Agriculture, Cambodia
 Royal University of Fine Arts
 Royal University of Law and Economics
 Royal University of Phnom Penh
 Royal University of Phnom Penh BRT station
 Rovieng Commune, a commune in Samraŏng District, Takéo Province
 Rovieng District, Preah Vihear Province
 Ruessei Krang, commune
 Ruessei Kraok, commune
 Rukhak Kiri District
 Rumduol District, Svay Rieng Province
 Rung Chrey, commune
 Rural Khmer house
 Russey Keo
 Russey Keo Section

S
 S-21: The Khmer Rouge Killing Machine
 S'ang
 S'ang District
 Sa Kaeo Refugee Camp
 Sabai Sabai Sesame
 Saigon River
 Sala (Thai architecture)
 Sala Baï Hotel and Restaurant School
 Sala Krau District, Pailin Province
 Saloth Chhay
 Samai Distillery
 Sam-Ang Sam
 Sam Rainsy
 Sam Rainsy Party
 Sam Sary
 Sambor Prei Kuk
 Sambuor, commune
 Sambuor Commune (Treang District), a commune in Treang District, Takéo Province
 Sambour District
 Sameakki, commune
 Sameakki Mean Chey District
 Phnom Samkos
 Samlar kako
 Samlar machu
 Samlaut Multiple Use Area
 Samleng Yuvachun
 Samlout District
 Sampeah
 Sampho
 Samphor
 Sampot
 Sampov Lun, commune
 Sampov Loun District
 Sampov Meas (district)
 Samraong, Banteay Meanchey (commune)
 Samraong (town)
 Samraong Commune (Samraong District), a commune in Samraŏng District, Takéo Province
 Samraong Commune (Tram Kak District), a commune in Tram Kak District, Takéo Province
 Samraŏng District, a district in Takéo Province
 Samraong Knong, commune
 Samraong Municipality, Oddar Meanchey Province
 Samrong Sen
 Samraong Tong District
 Samudra manthan
 San Yun
 Sandan District
 Sangkat
 Sangkat Baray (Doun Kaev Municipality)
 Sangkat Roka Knong
 Sangkat Roka Krau
 Sangkae District
 Sangkae River
 Sangkum
 Sangkum Banh Loloke
 Sangkum Jatiniyum Front Party
 Sangkum Thmei District, Preah Vihear Province
 Sangrama
 Sanlong Commune (Treang District), a commune in Treang District, Takéo Province
 Santebal
 Santepheap, commune
 Santuk District
 Santuk Silk Farm
 SAO Cambodia
 Saob Leu, village
 Saom Commune, a commune in Kiri Vong District, Takéo Province
 Saom Vansodany
 Sar Kheng
 Sarongk, commune
 Satha I
 Satha II
 Saukam Khoy
 Say Sam Al
 Sbai
 Scouting in Cambodia
 Sdach Domrei Sor
 Sdach Korn, King of Cambodia from 1498 to 1505
 Sdau, commune
 Sdok Kak Thom
 Se San River
 Sean Flynn
See Angkor and Die, 1993 Cambodian romantic drama directed by Norodom Sihanouk
 Sen-Ranariddh Coalition
 Sen Sok Section
 Senate of Cambodia
 Seng Sothea
 Senmonorom
 Senmonorom Municipality
 Sepak takraw
 Serei Mean Chey, commune
 Serei Saophoan (city)
 Serei Saophoan Municipality
 Serei Sophon River
 Serge Thion
 Sesan District, Stung Treng Province
 Sesan Commune
 Sesan River
 Si Votha
 Siam Nakhon Province
 Siem Bouk District, Stung Treng Province
 Siem Pang District, Stung Treng Province
 Siem Pang Protected Forest
 Siem Reap
 Siem Reap Airways
 Siem Reap Airways International
 Siem Reap International Airport
 Siem Reap Municipality
 Siem Reap Province
 Siem Reap River
 Norodom Sihamoni
 Norodom Sihanouk
 Death and state funeral of Norodom Sihanouk
 Sihanouk Boulevard
 Sihanouk International Airport
 Sihanouk Trail
 Sihanoukism
 Sihanoukville
 Sihanoukville Autonomous Port
 Sihanoukville International Airport
 Sihanoukville Province
 Sikhoraphum
 Silver Pagoda, Phnom Penh
 Sim Var
 Sinn Sisamouth
 Sinn Sisamouth discography
 Sino-French War
 Sisophon
 Sisophon Province
 Sisowath Kossamak
 Sisowath Monipong
 Sisowath Monireth
 Sisowath Monivong
 Sisowath of Cambodia
 Sisowath Quay
 Sisowath Ritharavong
 Sisowath Sirik Matak
 Sisowath Watchayavong
 Sisowath Youtevong
 Site Two Refugee Camp
 Sithean Reachea
 Sithor Kandal District, Prey Veng Province
 Skor chhaiyam
 Skor daey
 Skor sang na
 Skor yeam
 Skor yike
 Skuon
 Sky Angkor Airlines
 Sla Commune, a commune in Samraŏng District, Takéo Province
 Sla Kaet, commune
 Sla Kram, commune
 Slek
 Small Planet Airlines (Cambodia)
 Smaong Commune, a commune in Treang District, Takéo Province
 Smot (chanting)
 Snao Commune, a commune in Prey Kabbas District, Takéo Province
 Sneng
 Snoeng, commune
 Snuol District
 Snuol Wildlife Sanctuary
 So Savoeun
 Soben Huon
 Social Republican Party
 Society of Justice Party
 Soea, commune
 Soengh commune
 Soengh Commune (Samraong District), a commune in Samraŏng District, Takéo Province
 Sok An
 Sok Sovan
 Sok Sreymom
 Sokhom So, Vice President of the Cambodian Freedom Fighters.
 Sokimex
 Sokun Nisa
 Soma Norodom
 Somaly Mam
 Sombai
Somlenh Polokor, a Cambodian journal published during the 1960s
 Sompoan Yuvakok
 Son Ngoc Minh
 Son Ngoc Thanh
 Son Sann
 Son Sen
 Song of the Khmer Republic
 Sophat
 Sophea Duch
 Sophiline Cheam Shapiro, a choreographer, dancer and vocalist
 Sorya Shopping Center
 Sosthene Fernandez
 Soth Polin
 Souphi, commune
 Sour Phi Commune, a commune in Bati District, Takéo Province
 Sourn Serey Ratha
 Southern Cardamom National Park
 Soutr Nikom District
 Sovann Pancha
 Sovannahong
 Spean Praptis
 Spean Sraeng, commune
 Spean Thma
 Sphaerocoryne affinis
 Srae Ambel District
 Srae Ronoung Commune, a commune in Tram Kak District, Takéo Province
 Srah Chik, commune
 Srah Reang, commune
 Srah Srang
 Sralai
 Sralanh Khmer
 Srangae Commune (Treang District), a commune in Treang District, Takéo Province
 Sre Ambel
 Srei Snam District
 Srei Soriyopear
 Sreng River
 Srepok River
 Srey Santhor
 Srey Santhor District
 Sri Jayarajacudamani
 SS Columbia Eagle incident
 SS Mayagüez
 State institutions of Cambodia
 State Secretariat of Civil Aviation
 Staying Single When
 Steamed curry
 Steung Saen Municipality
 Steung Saen River
 Steung Trang District
 Stung Treng Airport
 Sticky rice in bamboo
 Stieng language
 Stoung District
 Stoung River
 Stueng Hav District, Sihanoukville Province
 Stueng Trang
 Stung Pouthisat River
 Stung Sen Wildlife Sanctuary
 Stung Treng
 Stung Treng Airport
 Stung Treng Bridge
 Stung Treng Municipality
 Stung Treng Province
 Sun Chanthol
 Sung, Cambodia, commune
 Suong
 Suong Municipality, Tboung Khmum Province
 Supreme Council of Consultants
 Supreme Court of Cambodia
 Supreme Patriarch of Cambodia
 Norodom Suramarit
 Surin Province
 Suryavarman I
 Suryavarman II
 Suvannamaccha
 Suvarnabhumi
 Suttantaprija ind
 Suy Sem
 Svay Chek (commune)
 Svay Chek District
 Svay Chek River
 Svay Chrum District, Svay Rieng Province
 Svay Don Kêv
 Svay Leu District
 Svay Pak
 Svay Pao, commune
 Svay Rieng
 Svay Rieng (town)
 Svay Rieng Municipality
 Svay Rieng Province
 Svay Teab District, Svay Rieng Province
 Jon Swain
 Swimming to Cambodia
 Sydney Schanberg

T
 Ta Baen, commune
 Ta Keo
 Ta Khmao BRT station
 Ta Khmau
 Ta Khmau Municipality
 Ta Khwai
 Ta Kong
 Ta Kream
 Ta Krei
 Ta Lam
 Ta Loas
 Ta Meun
 Ta Mok
 Ta Muen Thom
 Ta Nei
 Ta Our Commune, a commune in Kiri Vong District, Takéo Province
 Ta Phem Commune, a commune in Tram Kak District, Takéo Province
 Ta Phou
 Ta Pon
 Ta Prohm
 Ta Pung
 Ta Saen
 Ta Sanh
 Ta Sda
 Ta Som
 Ta Taok
 Ta Veaeng District, Ratanakiri Province
 Tabitha Cambodia
 Takéo
 Takéo Province
 Takhmao Bridge
 Talou Sen Chey District
 Tampuan language
 Tampuan people
 Tang Doung Commune, a commune in Bati District, Takéo Province
 Tang Yab Commune, a commune in Prey Kabbas District, Takéo Province
 Tbaeng Meanchey District, Preah Vihear Province
 Tbeng Meanchey Airport
 Tboung Khmum District
 Tboung Khmum Province
 Tea Banh
 Teav Aek
 Telecom Cambodia
 Telephone numbers in Cambodia
 Tean Kam
 Teng Bunma
 Tep Pranam
 Tep Rindaro
 Tep Sodachan
 Tep Sothy
 Tep Vong
 Terrace of the Elephants
 Terrace of the Leper King
 Thai numerals
 Thala Barivat District, Stung Treng Province
 Thavory meas bong
 The Burnt Theatre French-Cambodian docudrama directed and co-written by Rithy Panh.
 The Cambodia Daily
 The Cambodia Project
 The Killing Fields
 The Killing Fields, film
 The Last Days of Colonel Savath, film by Norodom Sihanouk
 The People of Angkor
 The Snake King's Child, 2001 Cambodian-Thai horror film
 Theatre of Cambodia
 Theavy Mok
 Theravada Buddhism
 Thiounn Prasith
 Thlea Prachum Commune, a commune in Kaoh Andaet District, Takéo Province
 Thlok Commune (Treang District), a commune in Treang District, Takéo Province
 Thma Bang District
 Thma Koul District
 Thma Puok (commune)
 Thma Puok District
 Thneap
 Thommanon
 Thommo Reachea II
 Thommo Reachea IV
 Thong (surname)
 Thpong District
 Thongvan Fanmuong
 Tida Sok Puos
 Tim Page (photographer)
 Timeline of Cambodian history
 Tith Dina
 Tioulong Saumura
 Tnaot Commune (Bati District), a commune in Bati District, Takéo Province
 Tonle Bassac (commune)
 Tonle Bati
 Tonlé San
 Tonlé Sap
 Tonlé Sap Biosphere Reserve
 TonleSap Airlines
 Tou Samouth
 Toul Kork
 Traditional Cambodian musical instruments
 Traeng
 Tralach Commune, a commune in Treang District, Takéo Province
 Tram Kak Commune, a commune in Tram Kak District, Takéo Province
 Tram Kak District, Takeo Province
 Tramung Chrum
 Trang (commune)
 Transport in Cambodia
 Transport in Phnom Penh
 Trapeang Kranhung Commune, a commune in Tram Kak District, Takéo Province
 Trapeang Krasang Commune, a commune in Bati District, Takéo Province
 Trapeang Prasat District, Oddar Meanchey Province
 Trapeang Sab Commune, a commune in Bati District, Takéo Province
 Trapeang Thum Khang Cheung Commune, a commune in Tram Kak District, Takéo Province
 Trapeang Thum Khang Tboung Commune, a commune in Tram Kak District, Takéo Province
 Trea Commune (Samraong District), a commune in Samraŏng District, Takéo Province
 Treang District, Takeo Province
 Treas
 Tro (instrument)
 Tro Khmer
 Tro sau toch
 Tro sau thom
 Tro u
 Tropeang Peay
 Truong Cang
 Trương Minh Giảng
 Tuek Chhou District
 Tuek Chhu Falls
 Tuek Chour
 Tuek Phos (town)
 Tuek Phos District
 Tuek Thla, Banteay Meanchey
 Tuek Thla, Phnom Penh
Tum Teav, the classic Cambodian love story
 Tumnob Rolok
 Tung Krahom
 Tung Padevat
 Toul Kok TVK BRT station
 Tuol Kouk Section
 Tuol Pongro
 Tuol Sleng Genocide Museum
 Tuol Ta Aek
 TV5 Cambodia
 Twilight (1969 film)

U
 Udayadityavarman II
 Udomkate Khmer
 Um Sereyroth
 Ung Hong Sath
 Ung Huot
 Union of Cambodian Democrats
 United Issarak Front
 United Nations Border Relief Operation
 United Nations Transitional Authority in Cambodia
 University of Cambodia
 University of Health Sciences (Cambodia)
 University of Puthisastra
 Uparaja

V
 Vandy Kaonn
 Vann Nath, Cambodian painter
 Vann Molyvann
 Vann Vannak
 Variin District
 Vassa
 Vat Phou
 Vattanac Bank
 Veal Veng District, Pursat Province
 Vehicle registration plates of Cambodia
 Veng Sakhon
 Vesak
 Veun Sai (commune)
 Veun Sai District, Ratanakiri Province
 Vice President of the State Council of Cambodia
 Vichara Dany
 Vietnam Railways 231 Class
 Vihear
 Villa Horror
 Vĩnh Tế Canal
 Vireakchey National Park
 Visa policy of Cambodia
 Voat Kor
 Voat Ta Muem
 The Voice of Cambodia
 The Voice of Khmer Youth
 Vorn Vet
 Vorvong and Sorvong
 Vyadhapura

W
 Wat
 Wat Athvea
 Wat Bakan, an ancient pagoda in Bakan district, Pursat province
 Wat Banan
 Wat Botum
 Wat Ek Phnom
 Wat Langka
 Wat Moha Montrey
 Wat Nokor
 Wat Ounalom
 Wat Phnom
 Wat Phnom Airlines
 Wat Phnom Daily
 Wat Preah Yesu
 Wat Saravan
 Water festival
 Water supply and sanitation in Cambodia
 West Baray
 West Mebon
 Western Khmer dialect
 Weapons of the Cambodian Civil War
 Western International School of Phnom Penh
 Western Stadium
 Who Am I? (2009 film)
 Wildlife of Cambodia
 Wildlife of Ratanakiri
 William Shawcross
 Women in Cambodia
 Women's Media Centre of Cambodia
 World Assistance for Cambodia

Y
 Ya Tung
 Yantra tattooing
 Yasodharapura
 Yasovarman I
 Yasovarman II
 Yat Hwaidi
 Yeak Laom, commune
 (Lake) Yeak Laom
 Year Zero (political notion)
 Yeay Mao
 Yem Ponhearith
 Yem Sambaur
 Yeun Savuth
 Yike
 Yim Sovann
 Ynav Bosseba
 Yol Aularong
 Yos Por
 Yos Son
 You Hokry
 You Khin
 Yun Yat

Z
 Zaman International School
 Zhou Daguan

See also 
 Outline of Cambodia

Cambodia